Tephroseris integrifolia (vernacular name: field fleawort) is a species of flowering plant belonging to the family Asteraceae.

Its native range is Europe to Siberia and Iran.

Synonym:
 Senecio integrifolius (L.) Clairv.

Subspecies: Tephroseris integrifolia subsp. maritima (Syme) B.Nord.

References

Senecioneae